The Pony Express Bible  is a Protestant Bible that was distributed to the Pony Express riders by the operators of the company in 1860 and 1861. In addition, the riders were required to sign pledges related to upholding their behavior according to specified Christian principles.

Description 
The special edition leather-bound Bible was given to all the employees by the operators Russell, Majors and Waddell. Its dimensions are about 5.7 inches (14.5 cm) tall by 3.6 inches (9.1 cm) wide and a little over 2 inches thick. It has 1,278 double-columned pages.

The copies of the Bible were specifically commissioned by Alexander Majors and contained full Protestant canon of both the Old and New Testaments. The firm had originally purchased these special copies for their company's wagon-train employees. The Bibles had gold lettering on the cover with a contemporary inscription and the wording, "Presented by Russell, Majors & Waddell. 1858". The source for the Old and New Testaments was an 1858 King James Version published by the American Bible Society in New York City.

On commencing employment, a Pony Express rider was given one of the special edition Bibles. The rider had to swear to and sign the frontier pledge of loyalty, honesty, and sobriety, that was on the inside front cover of the Bible: It appears that the 183 riders employed from April 1860 to November 1861 did not take the pledge very seriously. On the whole, they were considered "dreadful, rough and unconventional".

Background 
Alexander Majors, one of the original operators of the Pony Express, had religious convictions and required his employees to sign a pledge about their beliefs and behavior, which he based on the Christian Bible. For instance, employees were forbidden from swearing in public or drinking intoxicating alcoholic beverages; further, each rider was to honor Sunday as a day of rest. 

Initially the Pony Express riders were each issued certain pieces of equipment to carry, which included a bowie knife, and the Pony Express Bible. 

Later, most riders abandoned such equipment, because it was too heavy to carry and considered unnecessary for their journey. Some sources say that the riders did take the Bibles, at least initially. Other sources say the riders never carried the Bibles, since these added weight that would slow down their ponies. As an example of how lightly they traveled, many riders carried only a single pistol with an extra cylinder of bullets as a weapon on their rides. Some didn't take any gun, relying  instead on the speed of their pony to outrun hostilities.

Locations 
The Forty-fifth Annual Report of the American Bible Society shows 300 copies of the Bibles granted May 9, 1861, to Major and Russell by the Society.  As of the last record in 1960, 12 copies survived. Since 1980 only two of these Bibles have come on the market for public purchase.

 2 copies – Pony Express History and Art Gallery, San Rafael, California
 2 copies – Daughters of Utah Pioneers, Salt Lake City, Utah
 1 copy – Sons of Utah Pioneers, Salt Lake City, Utah
 1 copy – Bancroft Library, Berkeley, California
 1 copy – Denver City Library (Main), Denver, Colorado
 1 copy – Mormon Station State Historical Monument, Genoa, Nevada
 1 copy – Nebraska State Historical Society, Lincoln, Nebraska
 1 copy – State Historical Society of Colorado, Denver, Colorado
 1 copy – Society of California Pioneers, San Francisco, California
 1 copy – California Historical Society, San Francisco, California

A copy of the Bible is also held by the Library of Congress in Washington, D.C.

Society of California Pioneers 

Pony Express Bible owned by the Society of California Pioneers.

Overland Mail Company 
The Pony Express route that the riders used went through Utah, Nebraska and Kansas. They shared relay stations with the Butterfield Overland Mail Company stagecoach line. When the Pony Express firm was disbanded in 1861, the Overland Mail Company took over the western sections of the Pony Express route that went to Sacramento, California. The Pony Express route went through Missouri, Kansas, Nebraska, Wyoming, Colorado, Utah, Nevada, and California.

The Overland Mail Company station operators were issued the American Bible Society's 1859 edition of the Bible, which was the same as the 1858 edition of it.

Pawn Stars 
On the Pawn Stars television program in season 8, episode 55, called "Ponies and Phonies" (April 24, 2014), the Overland Mail Company Bible is compared to the Pony Express Bible by rare book consultant Rebecca Romney.

See also 
Central Overland California & Pikes Peak Express Co.
Postage stamps and postal history of the United States

Footnotes

Bibliography

External links 
Pony Express History – The Bible

American frontier
Central Overland Route
Express mail
1860 in the United States
1861 in the United States
History of United States expansionism
Religion and technology
18th-century Christian texts
Christianity and society in the United States
 
Pony Express stations
1857 books
1858 books
1859 books
1860 books
1861 books
Bible